The Pan American Cross Country Cup (Copa Panamericana de Cross Country) is an international cross country running competition organized by the Association of Panamerican Athletics (APA) for athletes representing the countries and territories of its member associations. It was established in 2015. Races are featured for senior, junior (U-20) and youth (U-18) athletes.  The inaugural 2015 edition in Barranquilla, Colombia simultaneously serves as NACAC Cross Country Championships and South American Cross Country Championships.

Editions

Results 
Complete results were published.

Senior men

Senior women

Junior men

Junior women

References 

 
Recurring sporting events established in 2015
2015 establishments in Colombia
Cross country